Boeing Starliner Calypso (Spacecraft 3) is a space capsule manufactured by Boeing and used in NASA's Commercial Crew Program. On 20 December 2019, Calypso launched on the Boeing Orbital Flight Test mission, an uncrewed test flight of Starliner to the International Space Station. The spacecraft was scheduled to dock to the ISS and then return to Earth following a week in space, although due to several software issues the spacecraft was unable to rendezvous with the station and landed after two days in space, resulting in Boeing needing to schedule a second Orbital Flight Test.

History 
In September 2014 Boeing was one of two companies selected by NASA to develop crewed spacecraft to ferry astronauts to the International Space Station, the other being SpaceX. Boeing planned to construct three Starliner spacecraft. The spacecraft's ability to be reused up to ten times with a six-month turnaround time between flights meant three spacecraft would be enough to satisfy the needs of the Commercial Crew Program. 

Spacecraft 3 launched for the first time on Boe-OFT, the first orbital flight of Starliner, on 20 December 2019. The uncrewed spacecraft was scheduled to dock with the ISS the following day. However, due to software errors causing the spacecraft's Mission Elapsed Timer (MET) to be off by 11 hours, the spacecraft performed an "off-nominal orbital insertion burn" that prevented the spacecraft from being able to rendezvous and dock with the ISS during the flight. Instead, the spacecraft remained in orbit for two days, performing as many tests as possible without the ISS rendezvous, and landed at White Sands Missile Range, New Mexico on 22 December 2019.

Upon landing, it was announced that the spacecraft would be reflown on Starliner-1, the first operational flight of Starliner to the ISS. After the announcement, NASA astronaut Sunita Williams, commander of Starliner-1, named the spacecraft Calypso after Jacques-Yves Cousteau's oceanography vessel, RV Calypso. Calypso is currently the only Starliner spacecraft to be given an official name. Although Calypso was initially scheduled to return to space on Starliner-1, Boeing announced in March 2020 that they would refly the Orbital Flight Test as OFT-2, which rearranged the spacecraft assignments for subsequent missions. Calypso will return to space on Boe-CFT, the first crewed test flight of Starliner. Following the spacecraft's second flight it is unclear when Boeing or NASA will fly the spacecraft again. Boeing is currently contracted to fly five operational missions to the ISS under the Commercial Crew Program following Starliner-1, so Calypso will likely see space for a third time on a later crew rotation flight.

As of November 2022, Boeing and NASA aim to conduct the crewed test flight in April 2023.

Flights 
Calypso flew in space for the first time on the Boe-OFT mission on 20 December 2019. The spacecraft is scheduled to be reflown on the Boeing Crewed Flight Test in April 2023, after swapping places with Spacecraft 2 on the Starliner-1 mission.

References 

Boeing Starliner
Individual space vehicles